St. Paul American School – Clark (SPAS) is a private K–12 school in the Philippines. It offers a US Based curriculum.  Founded in 2009, it has grown from 26 students in its opening year to over 240 students today.

Academics and curriculum 
The K–12 curriculum follows Math and Language Arts outcomes based on the common core state standards. NGSS for Science and AERO for Social Studies. It follows the US academic term.

Campus and facilities 
The campus is in the Berthaphil Clark center.

Facilities include:
 300 Meter running track
 Two libraries
Soccer Field
 IT Lab
 STEM Lab
 Gymnasium with full-sized basketball and volleyball courts
Cafeteria
Canteen / Coffee shop
Male and Female Dormitories

Organization and leadership 
SPAS has three schools: the elementary school which houses nursery to grade 5, the middle school with grades 6–8 and the high school with grades 9–12.  Each school has a leadership team composed of a vice principal, dean, and curriculum coordinator.

Student Population 
SPAS has over 240 students from over 14 different nations.

See also 

 St. Paul American School Beijing

References

2003 establishments in the Philippines
Educational institutions established in 2003
International schools in the Philippines
Private schools in the Philippines
Schools in Angeles City
Schools in Pampanga